This is a list of the first women lawyer(s) and judge(s) in Tennessee. It includes the year in which the women were admitted to practice law (in parentheses). Also included are women who achieved other distinctions such becoming the first in their state to graduate from law school or become a political figure.

Firsts in Tennessee's history

Law School 

 First (African American) female law graduate: Lutie Lytle in 1897

Lawyers 
First (African American) female: Lutie Lytle (1897) 
 First female (actively practice): Marion Scudder Griffin (1907) 
 First female to argue before the Tennessee Court of Civil Appeals: Frances Wolf (1907)

State judges 
First female: Camille Kelley in 1920 
First female (county judge): Kate M. Drake in 1931 
First female (probate court): Karen Webster 
First female (court of record): Martha Craig "Cissy" Daughtrey (1968) in 1975 
First female (Tennessee Court of Criminal Appeals): Martha Craig "Cissy" Daughtrey (1968) in 1975
First female (state trial court): Julia Smith Gibbons in 1981 
 First African American female: Bernice B. Donald (1979) in 1982 
 First female (Chancery Court): Sharon Bell in 1986  
 First female (Criminal Court of the First Judicial District): Lisa Niddifer Rice (1987) 
 First female (Tennessee Supreme Court): Martha Craig "Cissy" Daughtrey (1968) in 1990 
 First female (First Judicial Circuit): Penny J. White in 1990 
 First African American female (city court): Earnestine Hunt Dorse in 1990  
First African American female (criminal court): Carolyn Wade Brackett in 1994  
First female (Tennessee Court of Appeals): Holly M. Kirby in 1995 
First African American female (circuit court): Rita L. Stotts in 2000
First female (Chief Justice; Tennessee Supreme Court): Janice M. Holder in 2008  
First openly bi-sexual female: Rachel Bell around 2017 
First Latino American female: Ana L. Escobar in 2018

Federal judges 
First African American female (Court of Appeals for the Sixth Circuit; bankruptcy): Bernice B. Donald (1979) in 1988  
First female (United States District Court for the Middle District of Tennessee): Aleta Arthur Trauger in 1998  
First African American female (U.S. Court of Appeals for the Sixth Circuit): Bernice B. Donald (1979) in 2011  
First female (Presiding Judge; U.S. District Court for the Eastern District of Tennessee): Pamela L. Reeves (1979) in 2014

Deputy Attorney General 
 First female: Patricia J. Cottrell (1976)

Assistant Attorney General 
 First (African American) female: Etrula T. Trotter in 1974

United States Attorney 
 First African American (female) (Western District of Tennessee): Veronica F. Coleman in 2001 
 First female (Eastern District of Tennessee): Nancy Harr

Assistant United States Attorney 
Martha Craig "Cissy" Daughtrey (1968): First female to serve as the Assistant U.S. Attorney for the Middle District of Tennessee (1968)
Devon L. Gosnell: First female to serve as the Assistant U.S. Attorney for the Western District of Tennessee (1975)

Solicitor General 
 Andrée Blumstein (1981): First female Solicitor General of Tennessee (2014)

Tennessee Bar Association 
 First female (director/secretary): Billie Bethel
 First female president: Pamela L. Reeves (1979) from 1997-1998  
First African American (female) president: Joycelyn Stevenson

Firsts in local history
 Susan Marttala: First female to serve as District Attorney in the State of Tennessee as well as for the Thirty-First Judicial District in Tennessee (1986) [Van Buren and Warren Counties, Tennessee]
 Tammy Harrington (1994): First female judge in Blount County, Tennessee
 C. Vernette Grimes: First African American female to graduate from the Kent School of Law in Nashville (1939) [Davidson County, Tennessee]
 Martha Craig "Cissy" Daughtrey (1968): First female lawyer in Nashville's U.S. Attorney's Office. She is also the first tenure-track female professor at Vanderbilt Law School. [Davidson County, Tennessee]
Andrei Ellen Lee: First African American female to serve as a Judge of the Davidson General Sessions Court (2004)
Rachel Bell: First openly LGBT female judge in Nashville, Tennessee [Davidson County, Tennessee]
Ana L. Escobar: First Latino American female elected as a Judge of the General Sessions Court (Davidson County) (2018)
Kate M. Drake: First female judge in DeKalb County, Tennessee (1931)
Joyce Ward: First female judge in Hamblen County, Tennessee (1978)
Marguerite Lanham (1936): First female in Chattanooga, Tennessee admitted to the U.S. District Court (1939) [Hamilton County, Tennessee]
Sherry Paty: First female to serve as a City Court Judge for Chattanooga, Tennessee (2004) [Hamilton County, Tennessee]
Ophelia Dukes: First female magistrate in Hardeman County, Tennessee
Lalla Block Arnstein: First female magistrate in Knox County, Tennessee (1924)
Charme P. Allen: First female to serve as the District Attorney for Knox County, Tennessee (2014)
Sue Shelton White: First female lawyer in Jackson, Madison County, Tennessee
Dabney Anderson: First female magistrate of the Maury County Quarterly Court (1974)
Nancy Smith Sellers (1950): First female lawyer in Murfreesboro, Rutherford County, Tennessee
Donna Scott Davenport: First female judge in Rutherford County, Tennessee (2000)
Camille Kelley: First female to serve as a Judge of the Juvenile Court of Memphis, Shelby County, Tennessee (1920)
Alma Hogshead Law: First female magistrate in Shelby County, Tennessee (1929)
Nell Sanders Aspero (1933): First female lawyer in Memphis, Shelby County, Tennessee
 Ann Pugh (1976): First female judge in Shelby County, Tennessee
 Camille McMullen: First female from Shelby County to serve as an intermediate appellate court judge
Nancy B. Sorak: First female elected as a judge in Memphis, Shelby County, Tennessee. She was also the first female Public Defender for the City Court.
Earnestine Hunt Dorse: First African American female to serve as a judge in Memphis, Tennessee (1990) [Shelby County, Tennessee]
Carolyn Wade Blackett: First African American female to serve as a Judge of the Criminal Court in Shelby County, Tennessee (1994)
Karen D. Webster: First African American (female) elected as a Judge of the Shelby County Probate Court (2006)
Amy Weirich: First female to serve as the District Attorney for Shelby County, Tennessee (2011)
Phyllis Aluko: First female (and African American female) Chief Public Defender of Shelby County, Tennessee (2019)
Lee Ann Pafford Dobson: First female judge in Collierville, Tennessee (2019) [Shelby County, Tennessee]
Kee Bryant-McCormick: First African American (female) judge in Sumner County, Tennessee (2022)
Jane Franks: First female judge in Wilco, Williamson County, Tennessee

See also 
 List of first women lawyers and judges in the United States
 Timeline of women lawyers in the United States
 Women in law

Other topics of interest 
 List of first minority male lawyers and judges in the United States
 List of first minority male lawyers and judges in Tennessee

References 

Lawyers, Tennessee, first
Tennessee, first
Women, Tennessee, first
Women, Tennessee, first
Women in Tennessee
Lists of people from Tennessee
Tennessee lawyers